Tropical Depression Twelve-E was a short-lived but deadly tropical cyclone that dropped heavy rainfall across large portions of Central America in October 2011. It formed from a tropical disturbance roughly hundred miles south of Mexico, which fluctuated in organization for several days. By October 12, the National Hurricane Center (NHC) deemed the associated low pressure-area well defined enough for it to be considered a tropical depression. After attaining peak wind speeds of 35 mph (55 km/h), the depression moved ashore between Salina Cruz, Oaxaca, and Arriaga, Chiapas. It caused significant flooding and at least 30 fatalities in the region.

Meteorological history

Late on October 6, a low pressure area formed several hundred miles south of the Mexican coast. The disturbance quickly became more organized and two days later, the National Hurricane Center remarked that the low would likely strengthen into a tropical depression. However, thunderstorm activity diminished greatly near the center of circulation, with what little shower activity there was left displaced to the east due to high wind shear. On October 12, the system was finally declared a tropical depression.

Although the depression was initially forecast to briefly reach tropical storm status, this did not occur; instead, it remained a large monsoon-like system with the strongest winds well removed from the center. Shortly thereafter, the depression moved ashore between Salina Cruz and Arriaga. Deep convection decreased after landfall and it dissipated within 24 hours after formation, early on October 13. But the storm's remnants continued to effect Central America, until late on October 13, when the remnants of Twelve-E were completely absorbed by a monsoon trough, directly to the remnant's east. The monsoon then developed into a strong upper-level low, and left Central America, and the storm began moving northeastward, while slowly strengthening.

Preparations and impact
Upon the formation of a tropical cyclone, a tropical storm warning was issued for areas from Barra De Tonala to the Guatemala-Mexico border. The depression dropped intense precipitation over large parts of Central America, with many areas still receiving heavy rains. In 24 hours, rainfall totals of more than 12 in (305 mm) were recorded in Guatemala. Extensive flooding and multiple landslides caused heavy damage to roads, cutting them off to traffic. The profuse rainwater filled up rivers, causing them to overflow and exacerbating the flooding. It affected at least 81 of the country's 333 municipalities, and about 340 homes sustained damage. Authorities confirmed the deaths of at least twenty three people, and there were up to 30,000 storm victims in the country.

According to preliminary reports, heavy downpours caused extensive infrastructural damage and the collapse of six bridges in Nicaragua. Several telephone and electricity poles were downed, disrupting service to customers. Storm-related incidents caused the deaths of at least five people and affected around 3,000 others to some degree. Similar impact was reported in El Salvador, where over 15.7 in (400 mm) of rain fell in several locations. At the risk of flooding, The maximum precipitation was in Huizucar, with 1513 mm, this being the highest cumulative rainfall for the country, up to 4,300 residents sought shelter in schools, churches and public centers. At least 21 rivers burst their banks due to the flooding rains, while numerous mudslides inflicted damage to roads. Heavy damage also occurred to crop, particularly in coffee, beans, and maize plantains. Overall, at least 24 people were killed when the storm damaged their residences. Elsewhere in Costa Rica, landslides and flooding damaged property and roads, but there were no fatalities in the country. In Honduras at least 9 people were killed and thousands evacuated.

See also 
 List of Pacific hurricanes
 2011 Pacific hurricane season

References

2011 Pacific hurricane season
12E
12E
12E
12E
12E
2011 in Mexico
2011 in Guatemala
2011 in El Salvador
2011 in Nicaragua
12E
12E
2011 in Honduras
2011 in Costa Rica
12-E